Mamudnagar Union is a union of Nagarpur Upazila, Tangail District, Bangladesh.

Demographics
According to the 2011 Bangladesh census, Mamudnagar Union had 9,112 households and a population of 38,410. The literacy rate (age 7 and over) was 32.5% (male: 35.8%, female: 29.6%).

See also
 Union Councils of Tangail District

References

Populated places in Tangail District
Unions of Nagarpur Upazila